Wendela Kilmer (born 26 May 1947 in the Netherlands) is a popular globetrotting writer of over 33 romance novels since 1979 as Karen Van der Zee. She also signed two novels as Mona Van Wieren, and she received a RITA for Rhapsody in Bloom.

Biography
Wendela Kilmer was born on 26 May 1947 in the Netherlands. She grew up with her three brothers, while she dreamed about visiting the exotic places that read in their books.

She met a globetrotting American in Amsterdam, who asked her to marry him in Rome, Italy. After giving it some thought Wendela went to Nairobi, and they tied the knot in a ten-minute ceremony in Kenya. After Kenya, they lived in the States for a while, then four years in Ghana, West Africa where not only their first daughter was born but her first Mills & Boon romance as well. Karen's husband's work as a development economist has taken them to several other countries. They lived in Indonesia, in Ramallah, the West Bank, again in Ghana, Armenia, which lies east of Turkey and north of Iran and back to the US.

They now live in France. Furthermore, they have three grown kids, who live in the States.

Bibliography

As Karen Van der Zee

Single novels
Sweet Not Always (1979)
Love Beyond Reason (1980)
Secret Sorrow (1981)
Waiting (1982)
Going Underground (1982)
One More Time (1983)
Soul Ties (1984)
Pelangi Haven (1985)
Staying Close (1985)
Time for Another Dream (1986)
Fancy Free (1986)
Shadows on Bali (1988)
Hot Pursuit (1988)
Brazilian Fire (1989)
Java Nights (1990)
Kept Woman (1991)
The Imperfect Bride (1991)
Something in Return (1992)
Passionate Adventure (1993)
Making Magic (1993)
A Love Untamed (1994)
Captive in Eden (1994)
Fire and Spice (1995)
The Other Man (1995)
An Inconvenient Husband (1996)
Marriage Shy (1996)
Hired Wife (1999)
A Wife to Remember (1999)
Rand's Redemption (2001)
Midnight Rhythms (2003)
The Italian's Seduction (2005)

As Mona Van Wieren

Single novels
Rhapsody in Bloom (1989)
A Prince Among Men (1992)

Awards
Rhapsody in Bloom by Mona Van Wieren: 1990 Rita Awards Best Novel winner

References and resources
Karen Van der Zee's Official Website
Romance website

External links
Karen Van der Zee's Webpage and Mona Van Wieren's Webpage in Fantastic Fiction's Website

1947 births
Dutch women novelists
Dutch romantic fiction writers
Women romantic fiction writers
Living people
RITA Award winners
Pseudonymous women writers
21st-century Dutch writers
21st-century Dutch women writers
20th-century Dutch writers
20th-century Dutch women writers
20th-century pseudonymous writers
21st-century pseudonymous writers